Gmina Zakrzew may refer to either of the following rural administrative districts in Poland:
Gmina Zakrzew, Lublin Voivodeship
Gmina Zakrzew, Masovian Voivodeship